Dores may refer to:

People
 Sir Alexander Fraser of Dores, British physician
 Bruno Fernandes das Dores (born 1984), Brazilian murderer and football player
 Dores André, Spanish ballet dancer
 Janat Dores, founder of Janat
 Tiago Dores, member of Gato Fedorento

Places
 Dores, Highland, United Kingdom
 Dores de Campos, Brazil
 Dores de Guanhães, Brazil
 Dores do Indaiá, Brazil
 Dores do Rio Preto, Brazil
 Dores do Turvo, Brazil
 Dorés Lake, Canada
 Largo das Dores, Portugal